This list contains the names of Vietnamese provinces and province-level municipalities in Quốc ngữ script and the (now obsolete) Hán-Nôm characters. For geographic and demographic data, please see Provinces of Vietnam.

List of provinces

List of province-level municipalities

See also
Provinces of Vietnam
History of writing in Vietnam
Chữ Nôm

References

External links

Provinces
Vietnam geography-related lists